John McArthur (born 10 September 1938) is a former Australian rules footballer who played for Hawthorn in the VFL. He played as a half back flanker.

External links

1938 births
Australian rules footballers from Victoria (Australia)
Hawthorn Football Club players
Hawthorn Football Club Premiership players
Preston Football Club (VFA) players
Preston Football Club (VFA) coaches
Living people
One-time VFL/AFL Premiership players